Gregory Steven Keatley (born September 12, 1953 in Princeton, West Virginia) is a former Major League Baseball catcher who played for one season. He played in two games for the Kansas City Royals during the 1981 Kansas City Royals season.

External links

1953 births
Living people
Kansas City Royals players
Major League Baseball catchers
Miami Dade Sharks baseball players
Pompano Beach Cubs players
Baseball players from West Virginia
People from Princeton, West Virginia
South Carolina Gamecocks baseball players
Gulf Coast Cubs players
Midland Cubs players
Montgomery Rebels players
Omaha Royals players
Wichita Aeros players